Madison Brengle and Sachia Vickery were the defending champions but chose not to participate.

Sophie Chang and Angela Kulikov won the title, defeating Liang En-shuo and Lu Jiajing in the final, 6–4, 6–3.

Seeds

Draw

Draw

References
Main Draw

Berkeley Tennis Club Challenge - Doubles